"The Opposite" is the 22nd and final episode of the fifth season of the NBC sitcom Seinfeld. It aired on May 19, 1994. This is the last episode Tom Cherones directed. Andy Ackerman took over as the primary director the following season and held that role until the end of the show's run.

Plot
Elaine gets a raise at Pendant Publishing, which is merging with a Japanese conglomerate to avoid bankruptcy, and which is publishing Kramer's coffee table book. She has also reunited with her boyfriend Jake Jarmel. George remarks to Jerry in Monk's Café that every decision he has ever made has been wrong, and that his life is the exact opposite of what it should be. Jerry convinces him that "if every instinct you have is wrong, then the opposite would have to be right". George experiments with doing the complete opposite of what he would do normally. He orders the opposite of his normal lunch, and introduces himself to a beautiful woman who happens to order the same lunch, saying, "My name is George. I'm unemployed and I live with my parents." She is impressed and agrees to date him.

Jerry loses a stand-up gig and five minutes later is asked to perform another one on the same night, for the same pay, prompting Kramer to call him "Even Steven". This causes Jerry to start noticing how everything always ends up turning out exactly the same for him as originally planned, never losing or gaining. George continues to do the Opposite on his date with Victoria. He stops shaving, yells at noisy cinema-goers, and declines to come up to her apartment. Elaine, upon hearing that Jake has been in an accident, buys some Jujyfruits from a theater concession stand before heading to the hospital. Jake takes extreme exception to her Jujyfruit detour and breaks up with her.

The next day, Kramer appears on Live with Regis and Kathie Lee to promote his book. After kissing Kathie Lee on the mouth, he is disgusted by taste of the coffee and spits it all over Kathie Lee. This leads to his book tour being cancelled by Pendant Publishing, which arranged his tour. Thanks to his date, George gets an interview at the New York Yankees' headquarters, where he also does the opposite of his instincts and criticizes George Steinbrenner about his management practices, thus landing him the job of Assistant to the Traveling Secretary. He moves out of his parents' house. Enraptured with his success, he comes to regard the Opposite as his personal philosophy.

Elaine finds out that she is being kicked out of her apartment building. The list of grievances includes putting Canadian quarters into the washing machine and buzzing a jewel thief and a group of Jehovah's Witnesses past security. When her boss (Mr. Lippman) forgets his handkerchief in her office, Elaine tries to tell him, but cannot speak intelligibly with her mouth full of Jujyfruits. Later, when he sneezes without his handkerchief, he will not shake hands with his Japanese counterpart (and spread germs); the Japanese executive takes this as a sign of disrespect and refuses to close the deal, thus putting an end to Pendant Publishing. Elaine claims that she has "become George". Jerry can only marvel at how things always even out for him: first, Elaine was up and George was down; now, George is up and Elaine is down, but Jerry's life is exactly the same.

Production
According to Jerry Seinfeld, the line from George's angry rant at the movie theater – "...we're gonna take it outside and I'm gonna show you what it's like!" – is taken almost verbatim from a Buddy Rich bootleg tape on which he berates his big band players for playing too loud.

Regis Philbin, as recounted in his memoir How I Got This Way, was embarrassed and disappointed with Jerry Seinfeld and the show's writing crew after his repeated line, "This guy's bonkos!" bombed with the audiences. Philbin had objected to the line prior to the taping of the episode and wanted it removed, a request which Seinfeld and the writing staff ignored.

References

External links
 

Seinfeld (season 5) episodes
1994 American television episodes
Television episodes written by Larry David
Television episodes written by Jerry Seinfeld